The Waco Standard Cabin series is a range of American single-engine 4–5 seat fabric covered cabin biplanes produced by the Waco Aircraft Company beginning in 1931 with the QDC and continuing until 1942 when production ended for the VKS-7F. They were used as light passenger and utility transports, navigational trainers, bushplanes and briefly as maritime reconnaissance aircraft during World War 2.

Design
All of the Waco Standard Cabins were powered by cowled radial engines and Waco tried to accommodate their customers preferences for many of the more common commercially available engines of the period, hence the profusion of designations, as the first letter indicates the engine installed. Individual models were each certified with various available engines but not all variations found customers.

Fuselage structure was typical for the period, being welded chrome-moly tubing with light wood strips to fair the shape in and covered with fabric. Wings were built around two solid spruce spars with the airfoil formed from trussed ribs made from plywood and spruce. The leading edge was covered in aluminum sheeting and the whole assembly covered in fabric. Ailerons were interconnected with a strut mounted to the trailing edge and on some versions were sheeted with ribbed aluminum. Most models were not fitted with flaps – the VKS-7F, built for the Civilian Pilot Training Program (CPTP) being the exception. It was fitted with split flaps only on the undersides of the upper wings and at mid chord, inboard and just ahead of the ailerons. Wing bracing was with a canted N strut joining upper and lower wings, assisted by a single strut bracing the lower wing to the upper fuselage longeron, there being no bracing wires. Elevators and rudder were built up from welded steel tubing braced with wire cables, and both could be trimmed, the elevators in flight and the rudder with a ground adjustable tab. Normally the main undercarriage was made up of a pair of vees, sprung with oleo/spring struts and provided with brakes as standard equipment, and a free-castoring tailwheel sprung with triangulated shock cords. was fitted to most aircraft, although a small number for Brazil were fitted with a tail skid. Floats were also offered as an option, starting with the UIC which had Edo P-3300 floats. Later types (including the UKC, YKC and CJC) were offered with Edo 38-3430 floats.

Development
The standard cabin series were Waco's first successful cabin biplane design, and was developed to accompany the F series airframe in their lineup.  The Model C series had the top longerons raised to form a four-seat cabin which was entered through a door between the wings on the left side and had a rather distinctive rear-view window that was cleaned up, and then dispensed with in the later standard cabins. The initial QDC model of 1931 was offered with a  Continental A70 cowled engine, or as the BDC, ODC, PDC and UDC with other engines (as listed under variants). 1932 saw the introduction of the OEC and UEC models. Continuous refinement and improvement by Waco Aircraft resulted in production of various sub-models continuing until 1939.

In 1935, Waco introduced its slightly larger Custom Cabin series (which featured a sesquiplane layout without ailerons on the lower wing) and decided to differentiate between the Standard and Custom Cabin types by appending an S to the model designator. in 1936 the C-S was replaced with an 'S' signifying 'Standard'. For example, the YKC of 1934 became the YKC-S of 1935 and the YKS of 1936, though with additional minor improvements.

Operational history
The Standard Cabin series, with its cabin comfort, proved to be popular with private pilot owners. Many were purchased by small commercial aviation firms and non-aviation businesses. With the onset of World War II, examples were impressed into the air forces of many Allied nations, including the US (USAAC and US Navy), the United Kingdom, South Africa, Australia and New Zealand. USAAC Designations assigned to standard cabin Wacos included UC-72D (for 2 VKS-7s), UC-72K (for 1 YKS-7) and UC-72M (for 2  ZKS-7s). Most were used as utility aircraft, however a small number were operated by the US Civil Air Patrol, conducting anti-submarine patrols off the US coastline from March 1942 to August 1943 armed with 50- or 100-pound bombs. In 1942 21 VKS-7F were built for the Civilian Pilot Training Program for use as navigational trainers. A single impressed YKC referred to as the Little Waco, RAF serial AX697, was used by the British Long Range Desert Group (LRDG) along with a Waco Custom Cabin ZGC-7 Big Waco to support their activities behind Axis lines. After World War II, some impressed UC-72 cabins returned to civilian operations, and a very few were additionally revamped (with FAA approval) with new engine models. This further complicated model nomenclature, though the FAA generally retained original nomenclatures for a given re-engined airframe.
Fewer than 135 Standard Cabin series aircraft of several sub-models are currently registered in the USA.

Variants
Data from Aerofiles

Early Skylight

DC Series
BDC   Wright R-540 engine. No record of production.
ODC   Kinner C-5 engine.                      modified to QDC.
PDC   Jacobs LA-1 engine.                   2 built on special order.

QDC   Continental A-70 engine.             37 built.
UDC   Continental R-670 engine. No record of production.

EC Series
BEC   Wright R-540 engine.                  1 built, [X12440], (converted to OEC or UEC).
OEC   Kinner C-5 engine.                    3 built.
UEC   Continental R-670 engine.            40 built.

Late Skylight

IC Series

UIC   Continental R-670 engine.            83 built.

JC Series
CJC   Wright R-760 engine.                 41 CJC, DJC & DJC-S built.
DJC   Wright R-760 engine.

KC Series
UKC   Continental R-670 engine.

YKC   Jacobs L-4 engine.                   60 YKC built,

No Skylight

JC-S Series
CJC-S   Wright R-760 engine.
DJC-S   Wright R-760 engine.

KC-S Series
UKC-S   Continental R-670 engine.          40 built.
YKC-S   Jacobs L-4 engine.                 22 YKC-S built
ZKC-S   Jacobs L-5 engine.

KS Series
UKS-6   Continental R-670 engine. 2 built.
VKS-7    Continental W-670 engine. 18 built
VKS-7F  Only Standard Cabin with flaps, built for Civilian Pilot Training Program as navigational trainer. F designates use of flaps. 21 built.
YKS-6   Jacobs L-4 engine. 133 built. 65 YKS-6 built.
ZKS-6 & 7   Jacobs L-5 engine. 29 built. re-designated from ZKC-S in 1936.
HKS-7 (very rare)   Lycoming R-680-13 engine, installed with FAA approval.

Operators

Military operators
Most operators operated either a single example, or a very small number.

Argentine Air Force (8 x VKS-7)

Royal Australian Air Force (1 x YQC-6)

Brazilian Air Force (32 x CJC)

Royal Canadian Air Force (1 x YKS-6)

Air Force of El Salvador (2 x UEC)

Finnish Air Force (1 x YKS-7)
No. 36 Sqn used a Waco YKS-7 for maritime surveillance during World War II.

Mexican Air Force (1 x UIC)

 Royal Netherlands Air Force (1 x UKC)

Royal New Zealand Air Force – (1 x QDC, 1 x UIC)

 Royal Norwegian Air Force (1 x YKS-7)

South African Air Force (UEC, others)

Swedish Air Force (1 x UIC, 1 x UKC, 1)

Royal Air Force (1 x YKC)

United States Army Air Forces (2 x VKS-7 as UC-72D, 1 x YKS-7 as UC-72K & 2 ZKS-7 as UC-72M)
United States Navy (3x YKS-7 impressed – no USN designation used)
Civil Air Patrol (despite the name operated armed aircraft in a belligerent manner as a military organization)

Civil operators
Waco Custom Cabins were used in small numbers by a very large number of individual operators and were registered in the following countries (note that this list is not exhaustive).

Aircraft on display
Aside from the large number of Wacos that continue to exist in private hands, a number have also found their way into museums.

Specifications
Referenced from Juptner, U.S. Civil Aircraft, 1962, 1974, 1977 and 1980 (dates refer to specific volumes, not editions)

See also

References

Notes

Bibliography

Books

Websites

1930s United States civil utility aircraft
Standard
Biplanes
Aircraft first flown in 1931